Deedar (Urdu: ديدار) (born Sonia Idress on May 15, 1979 in Lahore) is a Pakistani stand-up comedian, actress and former dancer. She is famous for her work in Punjabi dramas.

Personal life and family 
She began her career in the stage dramas in Bahawal pur. She is the younger sister of dancer Nargis, and has a brother as well. Both sisters have worked together in various dramas. Her sister Samina died on December 31, 2017.

Career 
Deedar and her sister started a salon line called Mishi in Lahore, Islamabad, and Karachi Pakistan. The sisters even launched the salon in Toronto, Canada in 2009. Deedar continues stage dramas and is known for her dancing skills in Pakistani songs and movies.

She has also showed her performance in many events in Lahore.

References 

Pakistani stage actresses
Living people
1984 births
Pakistani female dancers
Punjabi people
Actresses from Lahore
Pakistani stand-up comedians